Kings Trough (sometimes spelled King's Trough) is an undersea trough in the North Atlantic Ocean. To the east it branches into the Peake Deep and Freen Deep. Surrounding the trough are high ridges and seamounts, such as the Antialtair Seamount and the Crumb Seamount complex. Various explanations for the complex have been suggested, ranging from compression, a former plate boundary, transform faulting or even an oblique meteor impact.

The trough, being in an apparently geologically stable region, has been studied as a possible location for radioactive waste disposal.

References 

Oceanic trenches of the Atlantic Ocean
Mid-Atlantic Ridge